Hedleytriphora is a genus of minute sea snails, marine gastropod mollusks or micromollusks in the family Triphoridae.

Species
Species within the genus Hedleytriphora are as follows:
 Hedleytriphora basimacula B. A. Marshall, 1983
 Hedleytriphora elata (Thiele, 1930)
 Hedleytriphora fasciata (Tenison Woods, 1879)
 Hedleytriphora innotabilis (Hedley, 1903)
 Hedleytriphora scitula (A. Adams, 1854)

References

 Marshall B.A. (1983) A revision of the Recent Triphoridae of southern Australia. Records of the Australian Museum supplement 2: 1-119

External links
 

Triphoridae